The Lunar sample displays are two commemorative plaques consisting of small fragments of Moon specimen brought back with the Apollo 11 and Apollo 17 lunar missions. The plaques and Moon rocks were given as goodwill gifts in 1970 and 1973 to the people of 135 countries, the 50 states of the United States, and to U.S. overseas territories by United States President Richard Nixon.

Description

Apollo 11 

The Apollo 11 lunar sample display is a commemorative podium style plaque display consisting of four rice-size dust particle specimens (dubbed "Moon rocks"), the recipient's flag and two small metal plates attached with descriptive messages.

In 1970, US president Richard Nixon gave presentation samples of Moon rock brought back by Apollo 11 as gifts to 135 countries and 50 US states.

Apollo 17 

The Apollo 17 lunar sample display consists of a Moon rock fragment from a lava Moon stone identified as lunar basalt 70017, the recipient's flag and two small metal plates attached with descriptive messages, all inside a wooden commemorative plaque.

Near the end of their third and final moonwalk, and what would be the last moonwalk of the Apollo program, Apollo 17 astronauts Eugene Cernan and Harrison Schmitt "picked up a very significant rock, typical of what we have here in the valley of Taurus-Littrow... composed of many fragments, of many sizes, and many shapes, probably from all parts of the Moon, perhaps billions of years old" and made a special dedication to the young people of Earth. This rock was later labeled sample 70017. Nixon ordered the distribution of fragments of the rock to 135 foreign heads of state and the 50 U.S. states. These gifts were distributed in 1973.

Recipients of Lunar sample displays 
Inside the United States, displays were given to all 50 states and four territories: American Samoa, Guam, Northern Mariana Islands and Puerto Rico.

Outside the United States, the following countries received displays:

Afghanistan, Albania, Algeria, Andorra, Argentina, Australia, Austria, Barbados, Belgium, Bhutan, Bolivia, Botswana, Brazil, Bulgaria, Burma, Burundi, Cameroon, Canada, Cambodia, Central African Republic, Ceylon (current Sri Lanka), Chad, Chile, China, Colombia, Congo (Brazzaville), Congo (Kinshasa), Costa Rica, Cuba, Cyprus, Czechoslovakia, Dahomey, Denmark, Dominican Republic, Ecuador, Egypt, El Salvador, Equatorial Guinea, Eswatini,  Ethiopia, Finland, France, Gabon, Gambia, Ghana, Greece, Guatemala, Guinea, Guyana, Haiti, Honduras, Hungary, Iceland, India, Indonesia, Ivory Coast, Iran, Iraq, Ireland, Israel, Italy, Jamaica, Japan, Jordan, Kenya, Kuwait, Laos, Lebanon, Lesotho, Liberia, Libya, Liechtenstein, Luxembourg, Madagascar, Malawi, Malaysia, Maldives, Mali, Malta, Mauritania, Mauritius, Mexico, Monaco, Mongolia, Morocco, Muscat and Oman, Nauru, Nepal, Netherlands, New Zealand, Nicaragua, Niger, Nigeria, Norway, Pakistan, Panama, Paraguay, Peru, Philippines, Poland, Portugal, Romania, Rwanda, San Marino, Saudi Arabia, Senegal, Sierra Leone, Singapore, Somalia, South Africa, South Korea, Southern Yemen, Soviet Union, Spain, Sudan, Sweden, Switzerland, Syria, Taiwan, Tanzania, Thailand, Togo, Trinidad and Tobago, Tunisia, Turkey, Uganda, United Kingdom, Upper Volta (current Burkina Faso), Uruguay, Vatican City, Venezuela, South Vietnam, West Germany, Western Samoa, Yemen, Yugoslavia and Zambia. 

Also, displays were given to the United Nations.

Bahamas, Bahrain, Bangladesh, Fiji, Solomon Islands (in that time a British overseas possession), Mozambique (in that time an overseas province of Portugal), Qatar, Tonga and United Arab Emirates didn't receive display of Apollo 11, but they received display of Apollo 17.

Current fate

Of the 270 Apollo 11 Moon Rocks and Apollo 17 Goodwill Moon Rocks that were given to countries by the Nixon Administration, approximately 180 are currently unaccounted for. Many of the Moon rocks that are accounted for have been locked away in storage for decades. The location of the rocks has been tracked by researchers and hobbyists because of their rarity and the difficulty of obtaining more. Moon rocks have also been subjects of theft and forgery.

See also 

 List of Apollo lunar sample displays

References 

 
Apollo program
Lunar science
Petrology
United States–European relations
United States–Central American relations
United States–South American relations
United States–African relations
United States–Asian relations
United States–Caribbean relations
United States–Middle Eastern relations
United States–North American relations
United States–Oceanian relations
Diplomatic gifts